Streetlife: The Untold History of Europe's Twentieth Century is a 2011 book by the British academic Leif Jerram.

Synopsis
Jerram investigates the transformation of Europe from the street level "from riot and revolution to sporting culture and sexual adventure".

Reception
In The Independent Christopher Hirst characterized the work as "lively" and in The Financial Times the book was praised as an "enjoyably idiosyncratic and provocative journey".
A lengthy review was also published in The Times Literary Supplement where the book was described as an "unromanticised, sweeping and informed cultural history of European cities in the long twentieth century".

References

2011 non-fiction books
Books about cities
Books about Europe
Books about London
Books about Paris
Books about politics of the United Kingdom
Books about urbanism
English-language books
Oxford University Press books
Non-fiction books about sexuality